Brayton Academy, formerly Brayton High School (previously to that, Brayton College) is a medium-sized high school located in Brayton (near Selby) North Yorkshire, England. The school provides for approximately 590 pupils ages 11 to 16, while being able to accommodate up to 1,280.

The school is located within the parish boundaries of Brayton, although its catchment area also covers other local villages and extends into parts of Selby.

Brayton High School opened in 1979 and was awarded Technology College status in 2001. It was renamed Brayton College in line with the Technology specialism, but in 2009 reverted to its original name and a new uniform. The school was re-designated as a lead specialist technology school in the Selby area again in 2009.

The school has reduced in size in recent years, once having had a student population of over 1000.

The school joined the Rodillian Multi Academy Trust in 2016, being re-named as Brayton Academy after it was found to fail its students (based on exam results).

In the school's first Ofsted Inspection since joining the Rodillian Multi Academy Trust it was graded as 'Outstanding' in all areas by Ofsted when inspected in June 2019.This was the first time the school sited here has ever been granted outstanding, reflecting the improvements that were significantly lacking since its first opening.

References

External links
Official Website of Brayton Academy
Official Website of Rodillian Multi Academy Trust

Educational institutions established in 1979
Secondary schools in North Yorkshire
Selby
1979 establishments in England
Academies in North Yorkshire